Tazehabad-e Marzian (also Romanized as Tāzehābād-e Marzīān; also known as Tāzehābād) is a village in Chahardeh Rural District, in the Central District of Astaneh-ye Ashrafiyeh County, Gilan Province, Iran. At the 2006 census, its population was 189, in 70 families.

References 

Populated places in Astaneh-ye Ashrafiyeh County